The Atlanta Braves have completed 152 years of professional baseball, the most in Major League Baseball. Through 2015, the Braves have played 20,994 regular season games in the National League and previously the National Association of Professional Base Ball Players, winning 10,595 games and losing 10,399 games, for a winning percentage of .505. In all MLB play, the team has a record of 10,677–10,483 through the 2015 season.

The team was founded in 1871 as the Boston Red Stockings and was one of the nine charter members of National Association of Professional Base Ball Players. The team changed its name to the Boston Red Caps in 1876 when it joined the National League. The team changed its name a few more times in the late 1800s and early 1900s before settling on the Braves name in 1912. In 1953, the team moved to Milwaukee. After 13 seasons in Milwaukee, the Braves moved again to their current city, Atlanta. The team played in Turner Field 1997 to 2016, and began the 2017 season playing in SunTrust Park.

The Braves have experienced several periods of success. The team was very dominant in the late nineteenth century, when it was known as the Boston Beaneaters, winning four of the five National Association of Professional Base Ball Players championships and eight National League pennants. In Milwaukee, the team never had a losing season. From 1991 until 2005 the Braves were one of the most successful franchises in baseball, winning fourteen consecutive division titles (omitting the strike-shortened 1994 season in which there were no official division champions) and five National League pennants. In the 2011 season, the Braves became the third team to win 10,000 MLB games. The franchise has won four World Series – one in Boston, one in Milwaukee and two in Atlanta. 

In addition, the Braves have experienced periods of futility. The team had eleven straight losing seasons from 1903 through 1913, during six of which they lost over 100 games. After a short period of prominence, the Braves between 1917 and 1945 experienced only three winning records and five 100-loss seasons, including having the fourth worst record in MLB history in the 1935 season. Between 1970 and 1990, the Braves achieved just one postseason appearance and suffered seventeen losing seasons out of twenty-one. During the 2011 season, the Braves became the second franchise to lose 10,000 MLB games.

This article lists the results of every season of the franchise, including years based in Boston and Milwaukee.

Table key

Year by year

<onlyinclude>
{| class="wikitable plainrowheaders" style="text-align:center; font-size:95%"
|-
!scope="col"|MLBseason
!scope="col"|Teamseason
!scope="col"|League
!scope="col"|Division
!scope="col"|Finish
!scope="col"|Wins
!scope="col"|Losses
!scope="col"|Win%
!scope="col"|GB
!scope="col"|Postseason
!scope="col"|Awards
|-
|align="center" colspan="11" style="background:#FFFFFF; color:#C8102E"|Boston Red Stockings
|-
|1871
!scope="row" style="text-align:center;"|1871 
|NA
| 
|3rd 
|20 
|10 
| 
|2 
| 
| 
|-
|1872 
!scope="row" style="text-align:center;"|1872 
|bgcolor="#ddffdd"|NA *
| 
|1st
|39
|8
| 
|—
| 
|
|-
|1873 
!scope="row" style="text-align:center;"|1873 
|bgcolor="#ddffdd"|NA *
| 
|1st
|43
|16
| 
|—
| 
|
|-
|1874 
!scope="row" style="text-align:center;"|1874 
|bgcolor="#ddffdd"|NA *
| 
|1st
|52
|18
| 
|—
| 
|
|-
|1875 
!scope="row" style="text-align:center;"|1875 
|bgcolor="#ddffdd"|NA *
| 
|1st
|71
|8
| 
|—
| 
|
|-
|align="center" colspan="11" style="background:#FFFFFF; color:#C8102E"|Boston Red Caps
|-
|
!scope="row" style="text-align:center;"|1876 
|NL
| 
|4th
|39
|31
| 
|15
| 
|
|-
|
!scope="row" style="text-align:center;"|1877 
|bgcolor="#ddffdd"|NL *
| 
|1st
|42
|18
| 
|—
| 
|
|-
|
!scope="row" style="text-align:center;"|1878 
|bgcolor="#ddffdd"|NL *
| 
|1st
|41
|19
| 
|—
| 
|
|-
|
!scope="row" style="text-align:center;"|1879 
|NL
| 
|2nd
|54
|30
| 
|5
| 
|
|-
|
!scope="row" style="text-align:center;"|1880 
|NL
| 
|6th
|40
|44
| 
|26.5
| 
|
|-
|
!scope="row" style="text-align:center;"|1881 
|NL
| 
|6th
|38
|45
| 
|17.5
| 
|
|-
|
!scope="row" style="text-align:center;"|1882 
|NL
| 
|3rd
|45
|39
| 
|10
| 
| 
|-
|align="center" colspan="11" style="background:#FFFFFF; color:#0C2340"|Boston Beaneaters
|-
|
!scope="row" style="text-align:center;"|1883 
|bgcolor="#ddffdd"|NL *
| 
|1st
|63
|35
| 
|—
| 
|
|-
|
!scope="row" style="text-align:center;"|1884 
|NL
| 
|2nd
|73
|38
| 
|10.5
| 
|
|-
|
!scope="row" style="text-align:center;"|1885 
|NL
| 
|5th
|46
|66
| 
|41
| 
|
|-
|
!scope="row" style="text-align:center;"|1886 
|NL
| 
|5th
|56
|61
| 
|30.5
| 
|
|-
|
!scope="row" style="text-align:center;"|1887 
|NL
| 
|5th
|61
|60
| 
|16.5
| 
|
|-
|
!scope="row" style="text-align:center;"|1888 
|NL
| 
|4th
|70
|64
| 
|15.5
| 
|
|-
|
!scope="row" style="text-align:center;"|1889 
|NL
| 
|2nd
|83
|45
| 
|1
| 
|
|-
|
!scope="row" style="text-align:center;"|1890 
|NL
| 
|5th
|76
|57
| 
|12
| 
|
|-
|
!scope="row" style="text-align:center;"|1891 
|bgcolor="#ddffdd"|NL *
| 
|1st
|87
|51
| 
|—
| 
|
|-
| style="background: #CCFFFF"| ‖
!scope="row" style="text-align:center;"|1892 
|style="background: #DDFFDD"|NL ‡
| 
|1st
|102
|48
| 
|—
|style="background: #CCFFFF"|Won World Series (Spiders) 5–0 *
|
|-
|
!scope="row" style="text-align:center;"|1893 
|bgcolor="#ddffdd"|NL *
| 
|1st
|86
|43
| 
|—
| 
|
|-
|
!scope="row" style="text-align:center;"|1894 
|NL
| 
|3rd
|83
|49
| 
|8
| 
|
|-
|
!scope="row" style="text-align:center;"|1895 
|NL
| 
|6th
|71
|60
| 
|16.5
| 
|
|-
|
!scope="row" style="text-align:center;"|1896 
|NL
| 
|4th
|74
|57
| 
|17
| 
|
|-
|
!scope="row" style="text-align:center;"|1897 
|bgcolor="#ddffdd"|NL *
| 
|1st
|93
|39
| 
|—
|bgcolor="#ddffdd"|Lost Temple Cup (Orioles) 4–1 *
|
|-
|
!scope="row" style="text-align:center;"|1898 
|bgcolor="#ddffdd"|NL *
| 
|1st
|102
|47
| 
|—
|
|
|-
|
!scope="row" style="text-align:center;"|1899 
|NL
| 
|2nd
|95
|57
| 
|8
|
|
|-
|
!scope="row" style="text-align:center;"|1900 
|NL
| 
|4th
|66
|72
| 
|17
|
|
|-
|
!scope="row" style="text-align:center;"|1901 
|NL
| 
|5th
|69
|69
| 
|20.5
|
|
|-
|
!scope="row" style="text-align:center;"|1902 
|NL
| 
|3rd
|73
|64
| 
|29
|
|
|-
|
!scope="row" style="text-align:center;"|1903 
|NL
| 
|6th
|58
|80
| 
|32
|
|
|-
|
!scope="row" style="text-align:center;"|1904 
|NL
| 
|7th
|55
|98
| 
|51
|
|
|-
|
!scope="row" style="text-align:center;"|1905 
|NL
| 
|7th
|51
|103
| 
|54.5
|
|
|-
|
!scope="row" style="text-align:center;"|1906 
|NL
| 
|8th
|49
|102
| 
|66.5
|
|
|-
|align="center" colspan="11" style="background:#FFFFFF; color:#C8102E"|Boston Doves
|-
|
!scope="row" style="text-align:center;"|1907 
|NL
| 
|7th
|58
|90
| 
|47
|
|
|-
|
!scope="row" style="text-align:center;"|1908 
|NL
| 
|6th
|63
|91
| 
|36
|
|
|-
|
!scope="row" style="text-align:center;"|1909 
|NL
| 
|8th
|45
|108
| 
|65.5
|
|
|-
|
!scope="row" style="text-align:center;"|1910 
|NL
| 
|8th
|53
|100
| 
|50.5
|
|
|-
|align="center" colspan="11" style="background:#FFFFFF; color:#0C2340"|Boston Rustlers
|-
|
!scope="row" style="text-align:center;"|1911 
|NL
| 
|8th
|44
|107
| 
|54
|
|
|-
|align="center" colspan="11" style="background:#0C2340; color:#FFFFFF; border:2px solid #C8102E"|Boston Braves
|-
|
!scope="row" style="text-align:center;"|1912 
|NL
| 
|8th
|52
|101
| 
|52
|
|
|-
|
!scope="row" style="text-align:center;"|1913 
|NL
| 
|5th
|69
|82
| 
|31.5
|
|
|-
|bgcolor="#ffcccc"| †
!scope="row" style="text-align:center;"|1914
|bgcolor="#ddffdd"|NL *
| 
|1st
|94
|59
| 
|—
|bgcolor="#ffcccc"|Won World Series (Athletics) 4–0 †
|Johnny Evers (MVP)
|-
|
!scope="row" style="text-align:center;"|1915 
|NL
| 
|2nd
|83
|69
| 
|7
|
|
|-
|
!scope="row" style="text-align:center;"|1916 
|NL
| 
|3rd
|89
|63
| 
|4
|
|
|-
|
!scope="row" style="text-align:center;"|1917 
|NL
| 
|6th
|72
|81
| 
|25.5
|
|
|-
|
!scope="row" style="text-align:center;"|1918 
|NL
| 
|7th
|53
|71
| 
|28.5
|
|
|-
|
!scope="row" style="text-align:center;"|1919 
|NL
| 
|6th
|57
|82
| 
|38.5
|
|
|-
|
!scope="row" style="text-align:center;"|1920 
|NL
| 
|7th
|62
|90
| 
|30
|
|
|-
|
!scope="row" style="text-align:center;"|1921 
|NL
| 
|4th
|79
|74
| 
|15
|
|
|-
|
!scope="row" style="text-align:center;"|1922 
|NL
| 
|8th
|53
|100
| 
|39.5
|
|
|-
|
!scope="row" style="text-align:center;"|1923 
|NL
| 
|7th
|54
|100
| 
|41.5
|
|
|-
|
!scope="row" style="text-align:center;"|1924 
|NL
| 
|8th
|53
|100
| 
|40
|
|
|-
|
!scope="row" style="text-align:center;"|1925 
|NL
| 
|5th
|70
|83
| 
|25
|
|
|-
|
!scope="row" style="text-align:center;"|1926 
|NL
| 
|7th
|66
|86
| 
|22
|
|
|-
|
!scope="row" style="text-align:center;"|1927 
|NL
| 
|7th
|60
|94
| 
|34
|
|
|-
|
!scope="row" style="text-align:center;"|1928 
|NL
| 
|7th
|50
|103
| 
|34
|
|
|-
|
!scope="row" style="text-align:center;"|1929 
|NL
| 
|8th
|56
|98
| 
|43
|
|
|-
|
!scope="row" style="text-align:center;"|1930 
|NL
| 
|6th
|70
|84
| 
|22
|
|
|-
|
!scope="row" style="text-align:center;"|1931 
|NL
| 
|7th
|64
|90
| 
|37
|
|
|-
|
!scope="row" style="text-align:center;"|1932 
|NL
| 
|5th
|77
|77
| 
|13
|
|
|-
|
!scope="row" style="text-align:center;"|1933 
|NL
| 
|4th
|83
|71
| 
|9
|
|
|-
|
!scope="row" style="text-align:center;"|1934 
|NL
| 
|4th
|78
|73
| 
|16
|
|
|-
|
!scope="row" style="text-align:center;"|1935 
|NL
| 
|8th
|38
|115
| 
|61.5
|
|
|-
|align="center" colspan="11" style="background:#002D72; color:#FFFFFF; border:2px solid #FFC72C"|Boston Bees
|-
|
!scope="row" style="text-align:center;"|1936 
|NL
| 
|6th
|71
|83
| 
|21
|
|
|-
|
!scope="row" style="text-align:center;"|1937 
|NL
| 
|5th
|79
|73
| 
|16
|
|
|-
|
!scope="row" style="text-align:center;"|1938 
|NL
| 
|5th
|77
|75
| 
|12
|
|
|-
|
!scope="row" style="text-align:center;"|1939 
|NL
| 
|7th
|63
|88
| 
|32.5
|
|
|-
|
!scope="row" style="text-align:center;"|1940 
|NL
| 
|7th
|65
|87
| 
|34.5
|
|
|-
|align="center" colspan="11" style="background:#0C2340; color:#FFFFFF; border:2px solid #C8102E;"|Boston Braves
|-
|
!scope="row" style="text-align:center;"|1941 
|NL
| 
|7th
|62
|92
| 
|38
|
|
|-
|
!scope="row" style="text-align:center;"|1942 
|NL
| 
|7th
|59
|89
| 
|44
|
|
|-
|
!scope="row" style="text-align:center;"|1943 
|NL
| 
|6th
|68
|85
| 
|36.5
|
|
|-
|
!scope="row" style="text-align:center;"|1944 
|NL
| 
|6th
|65
|89
| 
|36.5
|
|
|-
|
!scope="row" style="text-align:center;"|1945 
|NL
| 
|6th
|67
|85
| 
|30
|
|
|-
|
!scope="row" style="text-align:center;"|1946 
|NL
| 
|4th
|81
|72
| 
|15.5
|
|
|-
|
!scope="row" style="text-align:center;"|1947 
|NL
| 
|3rd
|86
|68
| 
|8
|
|Bob Elliott (MVP)
|-
|
!scope="row" style="text-align:center;"|1948 
|bgcolor="#ddffdd"|NL *
| 
|1st
|91
|62
| 
|—
|bgcolor="#ddffdd"|Lost World Series (Indians) 4–2 *
|Alvin Dark (ROY)
|-
|
!scope="row" style="text-align:center;"|1949 
|NL
| 
|4th
|75
|79
| 
|22
|
|
|-
|
!scope="row" style="text-align:center;"|1950 
|NL
| 
|4th
|83
|71
| 
|8
|
|Sam Jethroe (ROY)
|-
|
!scope="row" style="text-align:center;"|1951 
|NL
| 
|4th
|76
|78
| 
|20.5
|
|
|-
|
!scope="row" style="text-align:center;"|1952 
|NL
| 
|7th
|64
|89
| 
|32
|
|
|-
|align="center" colspan="11" style=";"|Milwaukee Braves
|-
|
!scope="row" style="text-align:center;"|1953 
|NL
| 
|2nd
|92
|62
| 
|13
|
|
|-
|
!scope="row" style="text-align:center;"|1954 
|NL
| 
|3rd
|89
|65
| 
|8
|
|
|-
|
!scope="row" style="text-align:center;"|1955 
|NL
| 
|2nd
|85
|69
| 
|13.5
|
|
|-
|
!scope="row" style="text-align:center;"|1956 
|NL
| 
|2nd
|92
|62
| 
|1
|
|
|-
|bgcolor="#ffcccc"| †
!scope="row" style="text-align:center;"|1957
|bgcolor="#ddffdd"|NL *
| 
|1st
|95
|59
| 
|—
|bgcolor="#ffcccc"|Won World Series (Yankees) 4–3 †
|Hank Aaron (MVP)Warren Spahn (CYA)Lew Burdette (WS MVP)
|-
|
!scope="row" style="text-align:center;"|1958 
|bgcolor="#ddffdd"|NL *
| 
|1st
|92
|62
| 
|—
|bgcolor="#ddffdd"|Lost World Series (Yankees) 4–3 *
|
|-
|
!scope="row" style="text-align:center;"|1959 
|NL
| 
|2nd
|86
|70
| 
|2
|
|
|-
|
!scope="row" style="text-align:center;"|1960 
|NL
| 
|2nd
|88
|66
| 
|7
|
|
|-
|
!scope="row" style="text-align:center;"|1961 
|NL
| 
|4th
|83
|71
| 
|10
|
|
|-
|
!scope="row" style="text-align:center;"|1962 
|NL
| 
|5th
|86
|76
| 
|15.5
|
|
|-
|
!scope="row" style="text-align:center;"|1963 
|NL
| 
|6th
|84
|78
| 
|15
|
|
|-
|
!scope="row" style="text-align:center;"|1964 
|NL
| 
|5th
|88
|74
| 
|5
|
|
|-
|
!scope="row" style="text-align:center;"|1965 
|NL
| 
|5th
|86
|76
| 
|11
|
|
|-
|align="center" colspan="11" style=";"|Atlanta Braves
|-
|
!scope="row" style="text-align:center;"|1966 
|NL
| 
|5th
|85
|77
| 
|10
|
|
|-
|
!scope="row" style="text-align:center;"|1967 
|NL
| 
|7th
|77
|85
| 
|24.5
|
|
|-
|
!scope="row" style="text-align:center;"|1968 
|NL
| 
|5th
|81
|81
| 
|16
|
|
|-
|
!scope="row" style="text-align:center;"|1969 
|NL
|bgcolor="#D0E7FF"|West ^
|1st
|93
|69
| 
|—
|Lost NLCS (Mets) 3–0
|
|-
|
!scope="row" style="text-align:center;"|1970 
|NL
|West
|5th
|76
|86
| 
|26
|
|
|-
|
!scope="row" style="text-align:center;"|1971 
|NL
|West
|3rd
|82
|80
| 
|8
|
|Earl Williams (ROY)
|-
|
!scope="row" style="text-align:center;"|1972 
|NL
|West
|4th
|70
|84
| 
|25
|
|
|-
|
!scope="row" style="text-align:center;"|1973 
|NL
|West
|5th
|76
|85
| 
|22.5
|
|
|-
|
!scope="row" style="text-align:center;"|1974 
|NL
|West
|3rd
|88
|74
| 
|14
|
|
|-
|
!scope="row" style="text-align:center;"|1975 
|NL
|West
|5th
|67
|94
| 
|40.5
|
|
|-
|
!scope="row" style="text-align:center;"|1976 
|NL
|West
|6th
|70
|92
| 
|32
|
|
|-
|
!scope="row" style="text-align:center;"|1977 
|NL
|West
|6th
|61
|101
| 
|37
|
|
|-
|
!scope="row" style="text-align:center;"|1978 
|NL
|West
|6th
|69
|93
| 
|26
|
|Bob Horner (ROY)
|-
|
!scope="row" style="text-align:center;"|1979 
|NL
|West
|6th
|66
|94
| 
|23.5
|
|
|-
|
!scope="row" style="text-align:center;"|1980 
|NL
|West
|4th
|81
|80
| 
|11
|
|
|-
|
!scope="row" style="text-align:center;"|1981 
|NL
|West
|5th
|50
|56
| 
|15
|
|
|-
|
!scope="row" style="text-align:center;"|1982 
|NL
|bgcolor="#D0E7FF"|West ^
|1st
|89
|73
| 
|—
|Lost NLCS (Cardinals) 3–0
|Dale Murphy (MVP)
|-
|
!scope="row" style="text-align:center;"|1983 
|NL
|West
|2nd
|88
|74
| 
|3
|
|Dale Murphy (MVP)
|-
|
!scope="row" style="text-align:center;"|1984 
|NL
|West
|2nd
|80
|82
| 
|12
|
|
|-
|
!scope="row" style="text-align:center;"|1985 
|NL
|West
|5th
|66
|96
| 
|29
|
|
|-
|
!scope="row" style="text-align:center;"|1986 
|NL
|West
|6th
|72
|89
| 
|23.5
|
|
|-
|
!scope="row" style="text-align:center;"|1987 
|NL
|West
|5th
|69
|92
| 
|20.5
|
|
|-
|
!scope="row" style="text-align:center;"|1988 
|NL
|West
|6th
|54
|106
| 
|39.5
|
|
|-
|
!scope="row" style="text-align:center;"|1989 
|NL
|West
|6th
|63
|97
| 
|28
|
|
|-
|
!scope="row" style="text-align:center;"|1990 
|NL
|West
|6th
|65
|97
| 
|26
|
|David Justice (ROY)
|-
|
!scope="row" style="text-align:center;"|1991 
|bgcolor="#ddffdd"|NL *
|bgcolor="#D0E7FF"|West ^
|1st
|94
|68
| 
|—
|bgcolor="#ddffdd"|Won NLCS (Pirates) 4–3 Lost World Series (Twins) 4–3 *
|Terry Pendleton (MVP)Tom Glavine (CYA)Bobby Cox (MOY)
|-
|
!scope="row" style="text-align:center;"|1992 
|bgcolor="#ddffdd"|NL *
|bgcolor="#D0E7FF"|West ^
|1st
|98
|64
| 
|—
|bgcolor="#ddffdd"|Won NLCS (Pirates) 4–3 Lost World Series (Blue Jays) 4–2 *
|
|-
|
!scope="row" style="text-align:center;"|1993 
|NL
|bgcolor="#D0E7FF"|West ^
|1st
|104
|58
| 
|—
|Lost NLCS (Phillies) 4–2
|Greg Maddux (CYA)
|-
|
!scope="row" style="text-align:center;"|1994 
|NL
|East
|2nd
|68
|46
| 
|6
|Playoffs Cancelled
|Greg Maddux (CYA)
|-
|bgcolor="#ffcccc"| †
!scope="row" style="text-align:center;"|1995
|bgcolor="#ddffdd"|NL *
|bgcolor="#D0E7FF"|East ^
|1st
|90
|54
|
|—
|bgcolor="#ffcccc"|Won NLDS (Rockies) 3–1Won NLCS (Reds) 4–0 Won World Series (Indians) 4–2 †
|Greg Maddux (CYA)Tom Glavine (WS MVP)
|-
|
!scope="row" style="text-align:center;"|1996
|bgcolor="#ddffdd"|NL *
|bgcolor="#D0E7FF"|East ^
|1st
|96
|66
|
|—
|bgcolor="#ddffdd"|Won NLDS (Dodgers) 3–0Won NLCS (Cardinals) 4–3 Lost World Series (Yankees) 4–2 *
|John Smoltz (CYA)
|-
|
!scope="row" style="text-align:center;"|1997
|NL
|bgcolor="#D0E7FF"|East ^
|1st
|101
|61
|
|—
|Won NLDS (Astros) 3–0Lost NLCS (Marlins) 4–2
|
|-
|
!scope="row" style="text-align:center;"|1998
|NL
|bgcolor="#D0E7FF"|East ^
|1st
|106
|56
|
|—
|Won NLDS (Cubs) 3–0Lost NLCS (Padres) 4–2
|Tom Glavine (CYA)
|-
|
!scope="row" style="text-align:center;"|1999
|bgcolor="#ddffdd"|NL *
|bgcolor="#D0E7FF"|East ^
|1st
|103
|59
|
|—
|bgcolor="#ddffdd"|Won NLDS (Astros) 3–1Won NLCS (Mets) 4–2 Lost World Series (Yankees) 4–0 *
|Chipper Jones (MVP)
|-
|
!scope="row" style="text-align:center;"|2000
|NL
|bgcolor="#D0E7FF"|East ^
|1st
|95
|67
|
|—
|Lost NLDS (Cardinals) 3–0
|Rafael Furcal (ROY)
|-
|
!scope="row" style="text-align:center;"|2001
|NL
|bgcolor="#D0E7FF"|East ^
|1st
|88
|74
|
|—
|Won NLDS (Astros) 3–0Lost NLCS (Diamondbacks) 4–1
|
|-
|
!scope="row" style="text-align:center;"|2002
|NL
|bgcolor="#D0E7FF"|East ^
|1st
|101
|59
|
|—
|Lost NLDS (Giants) 3–2
|
|-
|
!scope="row" style="text-align:center;"|2003
|NL
|bgcolor="#D0E7FF"|East ^
|1st
|101
|61
|
|—
|Lost NLDS (Cubs) 3–2
|
|-
|
!scope="row" style="text-align:center;"|2004
|NL
|bgcolor="#D0E7FF"|East ^
|1st
|96
|66
|
|—
|Lost NLDS (Astros) 3–2
|Bobby Cox (MOY)
|-
|
!scope="row" style="text-align:center;"|2005
|NL
|bgcolor="#D0E7FF"|East ^
|1st
|90
|72
|
|—
|Lost NLDS (Astros) 3–1
|Bobby Cox (MOY)
|-
|
!scope="row" style="text-align:center;"|2006
|NL
|East
|3rd
|79
|83
|
|18
|
|
|-
|
!scope="row" style="text-align:center;"|2007
|NL
|East
|3rd
|84
|78
|
|5
|
|
|-
|
!scope="row" style="text-align:center;"|2008
|NL
|East
|4th
|72
|90
|
|20
|
|
|-
|
!scope="row" style="text-align:center;"|2009
|NL
|East
|3rd
|86
|76
|
|7
|
|
|-
|
!scope="row" style="text-align:center;"|2010
|NL
|East
|bgcolor="#96CDCD"|2nd ¤
|91
|71
|
|6
|Lost NLDS (Giants) 3–1
|Tim Hudson (CPOY)
|-
|
!scope="row" style="text-align:center;"|2011
|NL
|East
|2nd
|89
|73
|
|13
|
|Craig Kimbrel (ROY)
|-
|
!scope="row" style="text-align:center;"|2012
|NL
|East
|bgcolor="#96CDCD"|2nd ¤
|94
|68
|
|4
|Lost NLWC (Cardinals)
|
|-
|
!scope="row" style="text-align:center;"|2013
|NL
|bgcolor="#D0E7FF"|East ^
|1st
|96
|66
|
|—
|Lost NLDS (Dodgers) 3–1
|
|-
|
!scope="row" style="text-align:center;"|2014
|NL
|East
|T–2nd
|79
|83
|
|17
|
|Craig Kimbrel (RPOY)
|-
|
!scope="row" style="text-align:center;"|2015
|NL
|East
|4th
|67
|95
|
|23
|
|
|-
|
!scope="row" style="text-align:center;"|2016
|NL
|East
|5th
|68
|93
|
|26.5
|
|
|-
|
!scope="row" style="text-align:center;"|2017
|NL
|East
|3rd
|72
|90
|
|25
|
|
|-
|
!scope="row" style="text-align:center;"|2018
|NL
|bgcolor="#D0E7FF"|East ^
|1st
|90
|72
|
|—
|Lost NLDS (Dodgers) 3–1
|Ronald Acuña Jr. (ROY)Brian Snitker (MOY)Jonny Venters (CPOY)
|-
|
!scope="row" style="text-align:center;"|2019
|NL
|bgcolor="#D0E7FF"|East ^
|1st
|97
|65
|
|—
|Lost NLDS (Cardinals) 3–2
|Josh Donaldson (CPOY)
|-
|
!scope="row" style="text-align:center;"|2020
|NL
|bgcolor="#D0E7FF"|East ^
|1st
|35
|25
|
|—
|Won NLWC (Reds) 2–0Won NLDS (Marlins) 3–0 Lost NLCS (Dodgers) 4–3
|Freddie Freeman (MVP)
|-
|bgcolor="#ffcccc"| †
!scope="row" style="text-align:center;"|2021
|bgcolor="#ddffdd"|NL *
|bgcolor="#D0E7FF"|East ^
|1st
|88
|73
|
|—
|bgcolor="#ffcccc"| Won NLDS (Brewers) 3–1 Won NLCS (Dodgers) 4–2 Won World Series (Astros) 4–2 †
| Jorge Soler (WS MVP)
|-
|
!scope="row" style="text-align:center;"|2022
|NL
|bgcolor="#D0E7FF"|East ^
|1st
|101
|61
|
|—
| Lost NLDS (Phillies) 3–1
| Michael Harris II (ROY)
|-

|-
!colspan=5 rowspan=4|Totals
!Wins
!Losses
!Win%
!colspan=3|
|-
!11,045
!10,817
!
!colspan=3|All-time regular season record (1871–2021)
|-
|105
|106
|
|colspan=3|All-time postseason record
|-
!11,150
!10,923
!
!colspan=3|All-time regular and postseason record
|}

These statistics are current at the conclusion of the 2019 Major League Baseball season.

Record by decade 
The following table describes the Braves' MLB win–loss record by decade.

These statistics are from Baseball-Reference.com's Atlanta Braves History & Encyclopedia, and are current as of October 3, 2021.  These statistics do not include post-season play or the seasons from 1871 through 1875.

Footnotes
 The Finish column lists regular season results and excludes postseason play.
 The Wins and Losses columns list regular season results and exclude any postseason play. Regular and postseason records are combined only at the bottom of the list.
 The GB column lists "Games Back" from the team that finished in first place that season. It is determined by finding the difference in wins plus the difference in losses divided by two.
 The 1994–95 Major League Baseball strike ended the season on August 11, consequently cancelling the entire postseason.
 In 2020, during the COVID-19 pandemic, Major League Baseball submitted a 60-game schedule for teams to play without fans in the stadiums.

References

 
Atlanta Braves
Seasons